Washington's 19th legislative district is one of forty-nine districts in Washington state for representation in the state legislature.

The district includes the western extreme of the state south of the Olympic Peninsula and runs from Aberdeen to Longview.

This mostly rural district is represented by state senator Jeff Wilson and state representatives Jim Walsh (position 1) and Joel McEntire (position 2), all Republicans.

See also
Washington Redistricting Commission
Washington State Legislature
Washington State Senate
Washington House of Representatives

References

External links
Washington State Redistricting Commission
Washington House of Representatives
Map of Legislative Districts

19